Datuk Seri Haji Mohamad bin Sabu (Jawi: محمد بن سابو), commonly known as Mat Sabu, is a Malaysian politician who has served as the Minister of Agriculture and Food Security in the Pakatan Harapan (PH) administration under Prime Minister Anwar Ibrahim since November 2022 and Minister of Defence in the PH administration under former Prime Minister Mahathir Mohamad from May 2018 to the collapse of the PH administration in February 2020. He has served as the Member of Parliament (MP) for Kota Raja since May 2018, Kuala Kedah from November 1999 to March 2004, Kubang Kerian from April 1995 to November 1999 and Nilam Puri from October 1990 to April 1995. He is a member of the National Trust Party (AMANAH), a component party of the Pakatan Harapan (PH) coalition. He has also served as the 1st and founding President of AMANAH since September 2015.

Mat Sabu is known for his public speaking abilities. He was detained twice under Malaysia's now repealed Internal Security Act (ISA).

Education
Mat Sabu attended school in Penang before continued his studies at MARA Institute of Technology (now Universiti Teknologi MARA; UiTM) in Diploma in Culinary Arts. However, he did not complete the course and dismissed.

Political career

NGO and PAS
Mat Sabu's political career began when he joined the Muslim Youth Movement of Malaysia (ABIM) in 1975. He joined PAS in 1981. He had served as Deputy President of PAS, a former component party of the former Pakatan Rakyat (PR) and Barisan Alternatif (BA) opposition coalitions, from 2011 to 2015. He was elected to the party deputy presidency in 2011, running on a moderate platform against the conservative incumbent Nasharudin Mat Isa. He had also served as the party Vice-President prior to his election as the party Deputy President. He was the first non-alim elected to the party leadership or deputy presidency in over 25 years.

AMANAH
On 6 May 2015, Mat Sabu and other progressive PAS leaders (referred to as the G18) were ousted at the 2015 PAS Party leadership election. They then launched Gerakan Harapan Baru (GHB) and took over the dormant Malaysian Workers' Party (PPPM), after their attempt to form a new party called Parti Progresif Islam (PPI) was rejected by the Home Affairs Ministry. GHB was later rebranded as Parti Amanah Negara (AMANAH) with Mat Sabu as its first President.

Minister of Defence 
In the May 2018 general election (GE14), Pakatan Harapan had successfully won to form the new government. On 13 May 2018, Prime Minister Tun Dr Mahathir Mohamad named three key members; Muhyiddin Yassin of BERSATU as Home Minister, Lim Guan Eng of DAP as Finance Minister, while Mat Sabu of AMANAH as Defence Minister in his Cabinet along with a Council of Eminent Persons (CEP). 

On 28 June 2018, Mat Sabu announced that Malaysia will withdraw its troops stationed in Saudi Arabia to reflect the country's neutrality in the region.

Controversies

Operation Lalang
He was detained twice under the Internal Security Act (ISA): from 1984 to 1986 under charges of being involved in extremist movements, and from 1987 to 1989 as a result of Operation Lalang, an operation that remains controversial in Malaysian politics. He was detained in the Kamunting Detention Center together with Lim Kit Siang and his son Lim Guan Eng of the Democratic Action Party (DAP). During his two years in the detention centre, Mat Sabu entered into a friendship with the father and son and defended the duo and their party from accusations of racism in 2017.

Statement over the Bukit Kepong incident
On 21 August 2011 during a speech in Gelugor, Penang, Mat Sabu stated that it was Muhammad Indera and the 200 Malayan Communist Party (CPM) guerillas who participated in the Bukit Kepong Incident in 1950 who deserved to be proclaimed as national heroes and not the police officers who died defending the Bukit Kepong police station, claiming that the police officers were British officers and the CPM members were the true national heroes as they fought the British. A video of the speech was uploaded on YouTube and received mainly negative responses, as the statement was regarded as an insult to the family members of the deceased policemen, as well as other national heroes not affiliated with the CPM such as the late Prime Minister Tunku Abdul Rahman and UMNO founder Dato' Onn Jaafar.

On 30 August 2011, Karpal Singh, the Bukit Gelugor MP at the time, responded by saying that the 25 policemen who died were true patriots and that Mat Sabu's statements were ill-advised.

However, PAS denied all the allegations and defended Mat Sabu's statement and claims.

On 1 September 2011, Mat Sabu also dispute the services of Sergeant Hassan defending the homeland.

On 20 September 2011, his home was splashed with kerosene and burned. His home in Section 19, Shah Alam was occupied by his son. His wife Normah Alwi (57) took care of his parents who were admitted to Kangar Hospital, Perlis. A police report was lodged at Section 15 of the Police Station, Shah Alam.

On 21 September 2011, Mat Sabu was charged under Section 500 of the Penal Code at the Butterworth Sessions Court for aggravating the image of their police and their families in a talk at Padang Menora on 21 August 2011. Lawyer Mohamed Hanipa Maidin said Mat Sabu was released on bail of RM15,000 until the day of trial. If convicted, Mohamad can be jailed up to two years, or fined or both.

Statement about Royal Malaysian Air Force jet fighter
On 31 July 2018, Mat Sabu revealed to the press that only four of the Royal Malaysian Air Force (RMAF)'s 18 Russian fighter jets were operational. This revelation was criticized by the veterans organisation Patriot and its president Arshad Raji as improper as it revealed the RMAF's level of preparedness.

Family
On 17 February 2011, Mat Sabu's mother, Halijah Mat, (91 years old) died at Kampung Guar Petai, Tasek Gelugor, Seberang Perai, Penang. His mother had been attacked by three strokes. Her body was held at the Padang Menora Mosque. Mohamad Sabu has seven siblings, namely Fatimah, Abdullah, Zainab, Sofiah, Mohamad, Kasim and Zaleha.

On 5 January 2019, Mat Sabu's son, Ahmad Saiful Islam Mohamad, was arrested with 100 others for testing positive for drugs in Kuala Lumpur. The case is being investigated under Section 15(1)(A) of the Dangerous Drug Act 1952 for drug abuse. He was convicted on 24 June 2011 but the Kuala Lumpur High Court had on 27 October acquitted him by allowing his appeal to overturn the guilty verdict and eight-month jail sentence over the drug abuse case.

Election results

Honours
  :
  Grand Commander of the Order of the Territorial Crown (SMW) – Datuk Seri (2023)

See also
 Pakatan Harapan

References

External links

 Mohamad Sabu's official blog 
 

Living people
1954 births
People from Penang
Malaysian people of Malay descent
Malaysian Muslims
Malaysian political party founders
Leaders of political parties in Malaysia
National Trust Party (Malaysia) politicians
Former Malaysian Islamic Party politicians
Government ministers of Malaysia
Defence ministers of Malaysia
Members of the Dewan Rakyat
Islamic democracy activists
Malaysian prisoners and detainees
Prisoners and detainees of Malaysia
21st-century Malaysian politicians